Stomias boa, also known as the boa dragonfish, scaly dragonfish, dragon-boa or boa scaly dragonfish, is a species of deep-sea fish in the family Stomiidae.

Three subspecies are recognised:
 Stomias boa boa (A. Risso, 1810)  
 Stomias boa colubrinus (Garman, 1899)
 Stomias boa ferox (J. C. H. Reinhardt, 1842)

Description
It has six rows of hexagonal areas above a lateral series of large photophores. The dorsal and anal fins are opposite each other, just anterior to the caudal fin.

Distribution and habitat
S. boa colubrinus is most common off the Congo coast and the northwest coast of South America.

Diet
Stomias boa eats midwater fishes and crustaceans; it rises to near the surface to feed at night.

Reproduction

References

Stomiidae
Fish described in 1810
Taxa named by Antoine Risso